Brockonbridge Gut is a  long 2nd order tributary to Delaware Bay in Kent County, Delaware.  Brockonbridge Gut is the only stream of this name in the United States.

Variant names
According to the Geographic Names Information System, it has also been known historically as:  
Baucumbrig Creek

Course
Brockonbridge Gut rises on the Murderkill River divide at Thompsonville, Delaware.  Brockonbridge Gut then flows northeast to meet Delaware Bay at Sandy Point.

Watershed
Brockonbridge Gut drains  of area, receives about 45.0 in/year of precipitation, has a topographic wetness index of 788.71 and is about 3.0% forested.

See also
List of Delaware rivers

Maps

External links
Report on tidal wetlands around Brockonbridge Gut

References

Rivers of Delaware
Rivers of Kent County, Delaware
Tributaries of Delaware Bay